This list of tunnels in Austria includes any road, rail or waterway tunnel in Austria.

Amberg Tunnel
Arlbergtunnel (railway)
Arlbergtunnel (road)
Bosruck Tunnel
Felbertauern Tunnel
Ganzstein Tunnel
Gleinalm Tunnel 
Pfänder Tunnel
Karawanken Tunnel (Karavankentunnel)
Katschberg Road Tunnel 
Koralm Tunnel
Plabutsch Tunnel 
Schmitten Tunnel, Zell am See.
Sigmundstor, Salzburg
Tauern Road Tunnel
Tauern Railway Tunnel

See also
List of tunnels by location
List of tunnels in the Alps
List of tunnels in Switzerland

Austria
Tunnels
 
Tunnels